Kent Ridge MRT station is an underground Mass Rapid Transit (MRT) station on the Circle Line in Queenstown, Singapore. The station is named after the geographical feature, Kent Ridge and is near the junction of South Buona Vista Road and Lower Kent Ridge Road.

Kent Ridge station is located at the eastern part of the National University of Singapore main campus, right underneath the National University Hospital.

History

Kent Ridge MRT station construction began in January 2005. This station was named 'National University Hospital', later was renamed to 'Kent Ridge' on 19 January 2006 to follow the geographical feature, Kent Ridge. After the completion of the MRT station on 23 September 2010, construction of One@Kent Ridge began with completion on 1 July 2012.

The station takes its name from the surrounding area, formerly known as Pasir Panjang Ridge but renamed Kent Ridge to commemorate a visit by the Duke and Duchess of Kent. Apart from the hospital complex, Kent Ridge station serves the sprawling National University of Singapore campus, along with Singapore Science Park 1 and Kent Ridge Park. Kent Ridge Bus Terminal is located on the other side of the campus, at Clementi Road, therefore it is not physically connected with the station.

Art in Transit
Under the Art in Transit programme, a multimedia work entitled Poetry Mix-Up was commissioned for the station. Created by Mixed Reality Lab from the National University of Singapore, this interactive piece allows members of the public to SMS a line of up to 60 characters to the program, and it will generate a short poem based on the submission to be shown on a digital display on the lift shaft at the platform level. These TV screens are however deactivated, and is only usable during the 2014 FIFA World Cup, 2014 Commonwealth Games and 2012 Summer Olympics.

Services and connections
Kent Ridge MRT station is served directly by local bus routes 92, 95 and 200. It is also a short walk from two bus stops on the Ayer Rajah Expressway serving the PSB Science Park building. NUS Routes A1, A2, D2, K and BTC also serve the station.

References

External links
 

Railway stations in Singapore opened in 2011
Queenstown, Singapore
Mass Rapid Transit (Singapore) stations